Vince Brautigam is an American football coach. He was most recently the head football coach at Cornell College in Mount Vernon, Iowa, a position he had held since the 2010 season. Brautigam previously served as the head football coach at Mount Senario College in Ladysmith, Wisconsin from 1990 to 2000 and the University of Dubuque from 2001 to 2008.

Head coaching record

Football

References

Year of birth missing (living people)
Living people
Cornell Rams football coaches
Dubuque Spartans football coaches
Mount Senario Fighting Saints football coaches
St. Cloud State Huskies football coaches
Iowa Wesleyan University alumni